{{Infobox academic
| honorific_prefix   = 
| name               = Jack Ogden
| honorific_suffix   = FSA, FGA
| image              = Jack Ogden in 2018.jpg
| image_size         =
| alt                =
| caption            = Ogden in 2018
| native_name        =
| native_name_lang   =
| nationality        = British
| occupation         = Jewellery historian
| period             =
| known_for          = Authentication of historic precious metal objects...
| title              = 
| boards             = 
| awards             =
| website            = https://independent.academia.edu/OgdenJack
| education          =
| alma_mater         = University of Durham
| thesis_title       = Gold jewellery in Ptolemaic, Roman and Byzantine Egypt
| thesis_url         = https://core.ac.uk/download/pdf/108635.pdf
| thesis_year        = 1990
| school_tradition   =
| doctoral_advisor   =
| influences         = 
| era                =
| discipline         = 
| sub_discipline     = 
| workplaces         = 
| doctoral_students  =
| notable_students   = 
| main_interests     =
 Historical development of jewellery materials and techniques
 History of the gem trade and gem cutting
 Use of 3D graphics in re-creating historic goldwork
| notable_works      =
 1982 book Jewellery of the Ancient World: The Materials and Techniques of Ancient Jewellery, Trefoil, London
 1994 book with D. Williams, Greek Gold: Jewellery of the Classical World, British Museum Press, London
 [http://blog.yalebooks.com/2018/04/20/diamonds-love-and-history 2018 book Diamonds: The early history of the king of gems]. Yale University Press
| notable_ideas      = Founding The Society of Jewellery Historians
| influenced         = 
| signature          =
| signature_alt      =
| signature_size     =
| footnotes          =
}}Jack Ogden''', FSA, FGA, is a British jewellery historian with a particular interest in the development of Materials and technology. He is considered one of the foremost experts in his field.The former curator of the J. Paul Getty Museum, Marion True, described Ogden as "a great English expert on ancient jewelry" in Michael Pfrommer, 2002, Greek Gold from Hellenistic Egypt’, J. Paul Getty Museum, Los Angeles p. ix He is the current President of The Society of Jewellery Historians, having held the position since February 2018, and was appointed Visiting Professor of Ancient Jewellery, Material and Technology, at the Birmingham School of Jewellery Birmingham City University in 2019
 Biography 

 Academic life 

Ogden was born into the fourth generation of a well-known family retail jewellery company"36. Ogden's and the tomb of Tutankhamun" – Harrogate History Tour’’ (2016) by Paul Chrystal based in Harrogate, North Yorkshire, but showed a strong interest in archaeology, particularly egyptology, from about the age of seven. A visit to the exhibition Tutankhamun and His Time at the Petit Palais, Paris in 1967 inspired him to study Egyptian jewellery techniques, thus blending his archaeology and jewellery backgrounds.

His first academic article, on Roman imitation diamonds, was published in 1973. A detailed study of platinum group element inclusions in ancient gold objects followed in 1977, that same year conversations with the late John Goodall FSA on ways to bring together academics from around the world who had an interest in the history of jewellery led to the founding of the Society of Jewellery Historians. His vision here was to bring together specialists to create better understanding and dialogue between scientists and the art historians.

Ogden has written and lectured extensively on the materials and technology of ancient and historical gold jewellery and various aspects of gem history."Jack Ogden… TOOLS AND TECHNOLOGY: GOLD WORKING IN A HISTORICAL CONTEXT” – Society of North American Goldsmiths' (SNAG) Conference 2013"we look forward to welcoming Dr. Jack Ogden, a world-leading expert in ancient jewellery, for a lecture… From the Meticulous to the Sublime" – Amaranthine Exhibition Launch, Kallos Gallery His 1982 book, Jewellery of the Ancient World, (Trefoil and Rizzoli), a study of ancient Old World jewellery technology and materials, received high praise and is still considered the standard work on the subject. Since then, publishers of his writings include The British Museum Press, University of California Press, Cambridge University Press, Oxford University Press, Yale University Press, the Getty Conservation Institute and several peer-reviewed journals. His books and articles are widely cited in the academic literature dealing with jewellery history and precious metals. Although primarily focussing on jewellery he has a wide interest in ancient Metals and contributed the chapter on metals in Ancient Egyptian materials and technology (Cambridge University Press, 2000). He has taught short courses on the history of jewellery materials and technology in London, New York, Washington D.C., Malibu, and Stuttgart.

Ogden has made various TV appearances and radio broadcasts, including interviews on historical aspects of jewellery, and acted as a historical consultant and a presenter for a multi-part documentary series on sapphires by China state broadcaster Central China Television (CCTV).

 Career 
After leaving Tonbridge School at the age of 16, he joined the family jewellery company founded by his great-grandfather, James R Ogden and Sons Ltd. He worked at both the Harrogate and London businesses until purchasing the London side of the business and the final few years of the lease in 1982, by which time he had established the Duke Street, St James's premises as a gallery specialising in ancient and historic jewellery. In 1985, with the expiry of the lease, he gradually wound down his business to concentrate on consultancy work and research.  He also started work on his PhD with Durham University. Although leaving formal education at sixteen and with neither A levels nor a university degree, Durham was happy to accept his 1982 book as 'equivalent qualification'. His supervisor was Prof John Harris, then Chair of Egyptology and the Director of the School of Oriental Studies at Durham. As a consultant, Ogden advises Museums, collectors, Auction houses and others, mainly on questions of authenticity of ancient and historic precious metal objects. He approaches this work holistically believing it essential to consider style, technology and composition.
He has also retained his links with the jewellery industry and served as the Secretary General to the World Jewellery Confederation (CIBJO) and Chief Executive of the National Association of Goldsmiths (now part of the National Association of Jewellers), a combined position (1995–2000) and as Chief Executive of the Gemmological Association of Great Britain (2004–2012).

He was appointed to the Treasure Valuation Committee (responsible for agreeing a value on UK archaeological treasure finds) in 1996 – 2013, serving as vice-chairman 2007 – 2013"Treasure Valuation Committee agree £3.285 million valuation for the Staffordshire Anglo-Saxon Hoard... The members of the Committee are: Professor Norman Palmer, CBE (Chairman), …Dr Jack Ogden” – British Museum Press releases, Staffordshire hoard valuation He was on the Governing Board of the Egypt Exploration Society 1983 – 1990. Ogden is the current Chair of British Standards (BSI) Committee STI/53 (Specifications and test methods for jewellery and horology) on which he has served from 1995 to 2000 and 2005–present. He was a Trustee of the Gemmological Association of Great Britain (2015–2018).

 Qualifications and honours 

His qualifications include a doctorate from Durham University (thesis topic Gold Jewellery in Greek, Roman and Byzantine Egypt), The Gemmology Diploma (FGA) (with distinction) from the Gemmological Association of Great Britain and the Diploma in Art Profession Law from the Institute of Art and Law (with distinction).
He was Elected a Fellow of the Society of Antiquaries of London (FSA) in 1980 and a life Fellow of the Gemmological Association of Great Britain in 2014."awards were presented to Dr Jack Ogden FGA… an Honorary Lifetime Membership of the Association for their outstanding contributions to Gem-A" – "Gem-A reveals graduation ceremony award winners", Professional Jeweller, 7 November 2014

 Personal life 
Apart from research in his field, his interests include playing the 5-string banjo and 3-D computer graphics. Before a knee injury he was an accomplished skier and briefly an instructor. He lives with his partner, Sara Abey in Henley-on-Thames, South Oxfordshire, and has three daughters.

 Selected bibliography 
Ogden is an author or co-author of several books and numerous articles on various aspects of the history of jewellery technology and materials, from scientific to popular. A full bibliography is available. Many of his articles are available online.

 Books and chapters in books include 
1982
 Jewellery of the Ancient World: The Materials and Techniques of Ancient Jewellery, Trefoil, London. OCLC No: 929802319
1987
 Islamic goldsmithing techniques in the early medieval period: the Benjamin Zucker collection, in ed. D.J. Content, Islamic Rings and Gems, Philip Wilson, London. OCLC No: 908849111
1992
 Interpreting the Past: Ancient Jewellery, British Museum Press, London and University of California Press, Berkeley and Los Angeles.   OCLC No: 716103810 Google books, Jack Ogden –  Ancient Jewellery
1994
 With D. Williams, Greek Gold: Jewellery of the Classical World, British Museum Press, London. OCLC No: 875379733 Google books, Jack Ogden – Greek gold
 The Technology of Medieval Jewellery. in eds. D. A. Scott, J. Podany and B. B. Considine, Ancient and Historic metals: Conservation and Scientific Research, Getty Conservation Institute Malibu. OCLC No: 802967527 The Getty Conservation Institute (GCI) Publications 
1995
 The Gold Jewellery, In ed C.-M. Bennett and P. Bienkowski, Excavations at Tawilan in Southern Jordan, Oxford University Press. OCLC No: 879106095
1998
 The Jewellery of Dark Age Greece: Construction and Cultural Connections. Ed. D. Williams, The Art of the Greek Goldsmith, British Museum Press, London. OCLC No: 39820658
2000
 Ancient Egyptian Metals, Eds. P.T. Nicholson & I. Shaw, Ancient Egyptian Materials and Technology, Cambridge University Press. OCLC No: 449825743
2003
 Connections between Islam, Europe, and the Far East in the Medieval Period: The Evidence of the Jewelry Technology, Eds P. Jett, J Douglas, B. McCarthy, J Winter. Scientific Research in the Field of Asian Art, Fiftieth-Anniversary Symposium Proceedings. Archetype Publications, London in association with the Freer Gallery of Art, Smithsonian Institution. Link to article OCLC No: 615473193
2004
 Revivers of the Lost Art: Alessandro Castellani and the Quest for Classical Precision in the exhibition catalogue: Castellani and Italian Archaeological Jewelry, edited by Susan Weber Soros and Stefanie Walker, Yale University Press and the Bard Graduate Center. (Also Italian translation 2005) OCLC No: 907117272
2007
 Brainbiter: The saga of Hereward the Wake. Penpress. (Fiction) OCLC No: 170956559 Google books, Jack Ogden – Brainbiter
2009
 A History of Enamelling Techniques in Enamels of the World 1700 – 2000, Ed. Haydn Williams, The Khalili Family Trust, London. OCLC No: 262894331
2010
 Gold’ in Tutankhamun's Footwear: Studies of Ancient Egyptian Footwear, Ed. André J. Veldmeijer, Drukware. OCLC No: 760141408 Google books, André J. Veldmeijer – Tutankhamun's Footwear
2013
 With Michael Spink, The Art of Adornment: Jewellery of the Islamic Lands, The Nasser D. Khalili Collection of Islamic Art, xvii (London: Nour Foundation in association with Azimuth Editions, 2013). OCLC No: 913073688 The Khalili Collections
2013
 Gems and the Gem Trade in India in Beyond Extravagance: a Royal Collection of Gems and Jewels, ed. Amin Jaffer, Assouline, New York. OCLC No: 839389448 Google books – Beyond Extravagance
2018
 In Press. Diamonds: The early history of the king of gems, Yale University Press – 'This richly illustrated history of diamonds illuminates myriad facets of the “king of gems,”'

 Articles include 
 1977 Platinum group metal inclusions in ancient gold artefacts, Journal of Historical Metallurgy, 11, 2. pp. 53 – 72.
 1990 With S. Schmidt. Late Antique Jewellery: Pierced Work and Hollow Beaded Wire, Jewellery Studies 4. pp. 5 – 12.
 1990/1 Gold in a time of Bronze and iron, The Journal of the Ancient Chronology Forum, 4. pp. 6 – 14.
 1991 Classical Gold wire: Some Aspects of its Manufacture and Use, Jewellery Studies, 5. pp. 95 – 105.
 1992 Gold in Antiquity, Interdisciplinary Science Review, 17/3. 
 1993 Granulation and a Greek Astronaut (a reinterpretation of Lucian) Jewellery Studies, 6. p. 73.
 2005 Diamonds, Head Hunters and a Prattling Fool: The British Exploitation of Borneo Diamonds, Gems and Jewellery, 14, 3, September 2005. pp. 67 – 69.
 2005 The Great American Platinum Controversy’. Gems and Jewellery,  14, 3 December 2005. pp. 86 – 87.
 2016 A Matter of Opinion'', Art Antiquity and Law. 21/3,  269 – 279.

References 

Alumni of Durham University
Year of birth missing (living people)
Living people
Fellows of the Society of Antiquaries of London
People from Harrogate
People from Henley-on-Thames
People educated at Tonbridge School
British archaeologists